The end is nigh is a phrase frequently used in relation to potential apocalyptical and eschatological events or the Biblical Apocalypse.

It can also refer to the following:

Film 
 "The End is Nigh", a chapter title in the Malcolm X documentary Seven Songs for Malcolm X
 Kiamat Sudah Dekat (The End is Nigh), a 2003 Indonesian film by Deddy Mizwar

Games and video games
 Watchmen: The End Is Nigh,  an episodic video game series
 The End Is Nigh (video game), a 2017 video game

Literature 
 The End Is Nigh (fanzine), defunct British fanzine
 The End is Nigh, the first book in the apocalyptic anthology trilogy The Apocalypse Triptych

Music 
 The End Is Nigh, a 2013 parody of the Lady Gaga song "You and I" by YouTube Internet personality VenetianPrincess
 The End is Nigh, a song by Irish rock band Bell X1 on their 2013 album Chop Chop
 Wake (The End Is Nigh), a song by American metal band Trivium on their 2013 album Vengeance Falls
 The End is Nigh, a song by Dutch doom metal band Officium Triste on their 2019 album The Death of Gaia

Other uses
 The End is Nigh, the last solo show before the semi-retirement of Tony Allen

See also

 
 The End is Nye, a 2022 television series starring Bill Nye
 Nigh
 Nye (disambiguation)
 End (disambiguation)